William Thomas is an English karateka.  He is the winner of multiple European Karate Championships and World Karate Championships Karate medals. William Thomas son Jordan Thomas is also a world class karateka.
In 2013 Thomas became the England National Coach winning cadet, junior and senior world championship gold medals before moving to Hong Kong in March 2017 to coach the Hong Kong National Karate Team achieving to date  Olympic bronze medal at the Tokyo 2020 Games.

In 2022 William Thomas MH received the Medal of Honour (MH) from Hong Kong SAR for his contribution and leadership of the Hong Kong National team and Olympic success.

References

1965 births
Living people
Black British sportsmen
English male karateka
British male karateka
Sportspeople from St Albans
World Games silver medalists
World Games bronze medalists
Competitors at the 1989 World Games
Competitors at the 1993 World Games
World Games medalists in karate